The Battle of San José del Cabo was a military engagement of the Mexican–American War which took place on two November days in 1847, after the fall of Mexico City.

Background
On 21 July, 115 men from the Seventh Regiment of New York Volunteers landed peacefully at La Paz, under the command of Lt. Col. Henry S. Burton. Before departing to capture Mazatlan on 11 Nov., Commodore William Shubrick landed 4 sailors and 20 marines, with a 9-pounder carronade, at San Jose del Cabo under the command of Lt. Charles Heywood.  Heywood's men made the old mission building into a fort.  Additionally, 12 Californians joined the American force, occupying the Mott house.

Captain Manuel Pineda Munoz had sent Vincente Mejia, Jose Matias Moreno and José Antonio Mijares with 150 men from La Paz to demand the surrender of the San Jose del Cabo garrison, which was refused on 19 Nov.

Battle
On 19 November at 3 PM, 150 mounted Mexican men occupied La Somita. At sunset, the Mexicans used their 6-pounder to fire upon the Americans along Main Street, which did little damage. The Mexicans were beaten back from an attack on the Mott house at 10 PM and the south end of Main street, the Mexicans retiring only at daylight.

20 November was quiet until sunset, when the Mexicans attacked, attempting to capture the American gun and gain the roof of the fort, but grape shot, canister shot and musket fire stopped the attack. On 21 November, the whalers Magnolia and Edward arrived, and the Mexican force withdrew after the discharge of the whalers' guns.

Aftermath
Upon hearing of the attack at San José del Cabo, Commodore Shubrick sent the storeship USS Southampton and the first-class sloop-of-war  to reinforce Heywood's men. The Southampton arrived on November 26 and the Portsmouth on December 3.

Captain Pineda, facing two defeats, one at La Paz where he personally commanded the battle, recalled his company from San José and decided to escalate his attack strength, first at the Siege of La Paz and then again at the Siege of San José del Cabo. For his brave action, the Mexicans consider the death of Lieutenant Mijares as heroic and have placed a monument to honor him on the main street of San José del Cabo, which is called Boulevard Antonio Mijares.

References

Further reading
 Nathan Covington Brooks, A Complete History of the Mexican War (The Rio Grande Press, Inc., 1965).
 Justin H. Smith, The War With Mexico, Vols. I and II. (Peter Smith, Gloucester, Massachusetts, 1963).
 John R. Spears, The History of the Navy, Vol. III (Charles Scribner's Sons, New York, 1897), pp. 401–409.
 K. Jack Bauer, Surfboats and Horse Marines (U.S. Naval Institute, Annapolis, Maryland, 1969).
 President James K. Polk's Message on War with Mexico, May 11, 1846, in Documents of American History, 9th edition, Vol. I (Prentice Hall, Inc., 1979), p. 311.

San Jose del Cabo
San Jose del Cabo
United States Marine Corps in the 18th and 19th centuries
1847 in the Mexican-American War
1847 in Mexico
November 1847 events